The 21st Genie Awards were held in 2001 to honour films released in 2000. The ceremony was hosted by Brian Linehan.

Nominees and winners
The Genie Award winner in each category is shown in bold along with nominees.

References
 

21
Genie
Genie